The 2019 Patriot League softball tournament was held at the BU Softball Field on the campus of Boston University in Boston, Massachusetts from May 9 through May 11, 2019. The tournament was won by the Boston University Terriers, who earned the Patriot League's automatic bid to the 2019 NCAA Division I softball tournament

Tournament

Bracket

References

Patriot League softball tournament
Patriot League softball tournament
Tournament